Ah Ying (半邊人) is a 1983 Hong Kong film directed by Allen Fong. It stars Chi-Hung Chang, Pui Hui, So-ying Hui, and Kei Shu. It won the Best Film Award at the 3rd Hong Kong Film Awards. It was also entered into the 34th Berlin International Film Festival.

Awards
3rd Hong Kong Film Awards
 Won: Best Film
 Won: Best Director - Allen Fong

References

External links
 

1983 films
Best Film HKFA
Films directed by Allen Fong
Hong Kong drama films
1980s Hong Kong films